is the 35th single by Japanese idol group Berryz Kobo,  released in Japan on June 4, 2014.

The physical CD single debuted at 4th place in the Japanese Oricon weekly singles chart.

Charts

References 

2014 singles
Japanese-language songs
Berryz Kobo songs
Songs written by Tsunku
Song recordings produced by Tsunku
2014 songs
Piccolo Town singles